The NFC Institute of Engineering and Fertilizer Research (NFC-IEFR) is an oldest engineering institute located in Faisalabad, Punjab, Pakistan. It is affiliated with University of Engineering and Technology, Lahore for awarding of degrees.

Recognition
 Accredited by Pakistan Engineering Council.
 Affiliated with University of Engineering and Technology, Lahore

Campus
The university is spread over 25 acres. The main building of the institute has administration wing, central library, spectacular air-conditioned auditorium, seminar hall, conference room, IT and linguistic laboratories and research and development department. The academic block is composed of offices for faculty members, classrooms, laboratories and computational lab. For the extension of facilities in the IE&FR campus, a three-story multi purposes block has been constructed, which comprises a large number of multi-disciplined laboratories, classrooms and offices for faculty members.

Academics

Degree programs
The disciplines and the degree programs offered by the institute have been tabulated below. The regular duration of BS and MS/M Phil degree programs is 4 and 2 years, respectively.

Societies
Following is a list of the officially constituted societies:
 ASHRAE NFC Faisalabad Student Branch
 ASME IE&FR Student Section 
 IEFRian Forum
 Hostel Society
 Blood Donors Society
 Debating Society
 IEEE NFC Student Branch - Lahore Section
 Media Club - NFC IEFR (Media)

See also 
NFC Institute of Engineering and Technology, Multan

References

External links
 

Engineering universities and colleges in Pakistan
Research institutes in Pakistan
Universities and colleges in Faisalabad District
Engineering research institutes